Small EDRK-rich factor 2 is a protein that in humans is encoded by the SERF2 gene.

References

Further reading

External links